Punching Henry is a 2016 American comedy film directed by Gregori Viens and written by Gregori Viens and Henry Phillips. It is a sequel to the 2009 film Punching the Clown. The film stars Henry Phillips, Tig Notaro, Jim Jefferies, Doug Stanhope, Sarah Silverman and J. K. Simmons. The film was released on February 24, 2017, by Well Go USA Entertainment.

Plot
Henry Phillips (Phillips, in a semi-fictional version of himself) is trying to make it big as a comedian. He is lured to Los Angeles by a producer (Simmons) to join a reality show, where he finds himself the butt of jokes rather than telling them.

Cast
Henry Phillips as himself
Tig Notaro as Jillian
Jim Jefferies as Charlie
Doug Stanhope as Cab Dispatcher
Sarah Silverman as Sharon Levine
J. K. Simmons as Jay Warren
Mark Cohen as Stupid Joe
Ellen Ratner as Ellen Pinksy
Mike Judge as Ed
Stephanie Allynne as Zoe
Clifton Collins Jr. as Dramatic Actor
Michaela Watkins as Mara
Derek Waters as Dave the Producer
Wayne Federman as Carl Rohmer
Ashley Johnson as Danielle
Al Madrigal as Officer Delgado
Myq Kaplan as Zack
Matt Kirshen as Matt
Ginger Gonzaga as Erica
Amy Hill as Adjudicator
Adam Nee as Funny Guitar Boy 
Nikki Glaser as Claire the Bartender 
Angela Trimbur as Sascha 
Brendon Walsh as Jon 
Greg Warren as Kalamazoo MC 
Peter White as Phil

Release
The film premiered at South by Southwest on March 13, 2016. The film was released on February 24, 2017, by Well Go USA Entertainment.

References

External links
 

2016 films
2016 comedy films
American comedy films
Films about comedians
2010s English-language films
2010s American films